Muhammed Dawood may refer to:

Muhammed Dawood, alias for Guantanamo detainee David Hicks
Mohammed Dawood (Bagram detainee), one of the detainees whose amalgamated habeas corpus petition is known as Ghulam Mohammed v. Don Rumsfeld
Mohammed Dawood Yaseen (born 2000), Iraqi footballer